Bayou orthohantavirus (BAYV) is a species of Orthohantavirus first identified in 1993 in Louisiana. and later confirmed by other investigators. In 1996, the marsh rice rat was identified as the natural reservoir of the virus,
indicating the virus to be widespread throughout the Southeastern United States. BAYV infection causes hantavirus pulmonary syndrome (HPS) and represents the second most common hantavirus in the United States behind the Sin Nombre orthohantavirus.

References

Hantaviridae